Oren Muharer (born March 16, 1971) is a retired Israeli footballer who now acts as the manager of Hapoel Aliyah Kfar Saba.

Honours
Liga Bet (2):
2007-08, 2008–09
Israel Beach Soccer League (3):
2008, 2009, 2010

References

External links
 

1971 births
Living people
Israeli Jews
Israeli footballers
Israeli football managers
Israeli beach soccer players
Hapoel Kfar Saba F.C. players
Hapoel Petah Tikva F.C. players
Bnei Sakhnin F.C. players
Hapoel Hadera F.C. players
Association football forwards